WWW - What a Wonderful World is a 2006 Moroccan comedy film directed by Faouzi Bensaïdi.

Cast 
 Faouzi Bensaïdi - Kamel
 Nezha Rahile - Kenza 
 Fatima Attif - Souad
 Hajar Masdouki - Fatima
 El Mehdi Elaaroubi - Hicham

External links

References

2006 comedy films
2006 films
Films directed by Faouzi Bensaïdi
French comedy films
German comedy films
Moroccan comedy films
2000s French films
2000s German films